Marie Anne de Bourbon (24 February 1678 – 11 April 1718) was the daughter of Henri Jules, Prince of Condé, and Anne Henriette of Bavaria. As a member of the reigning House of Bourbon, she was a Princesse du Sang. She was the duchesse de Vendôme by marriage. She was also the Duchess of Étampes in her own right.

Biography
Born in Paris in 1678, she was the ninth child of her parents, and the youngest to survive infancy.  In her youth she was known as Mademoiselle de Montmorency, a style derived from one of her grandfather's titles. Her father, the Duke of Bourbon and First Prince of the Blood, was the eldest surviving son of the Grand Condé. 

Marie Anne was born and lived at the Hôtel de Condé, Paris, where her father was abusive to her as well as her mother, Anne Henriette of Bavaria. He frequently beat them. Marie Anne was among the last of her many siblings to marry. In 1704, her father had wanted her to marry Ferdinand Charles, Duke of Mantua and Montferrat, but the proposal did not materialise and Ferdinand Charles instead married Suzanne Henriette de Lorraine known as Mademoiselle d'Elbeuf. 

With the help of her sister Louise Bénédicte, duchesse du Maine, and without the permission of their mother (their father and brother having died by this time), Marie Anne married her distant cousin, Louis Joseph, Duke of Vendôme, a great-grandson of Henry IV of France by his mistress Gabrielle d'Estrées. The couple wed on 21 May 1710 in the chapel of the Château de Sceaux, Louise Bénédicte's home. Although the dowager princesse de Condé was not informed of the marriage, she was present at the bedding ceremony at Sceaux along with Louis Henri, Duke of Bourbon; his wife Marie Anne de Bourbon; the dowager princess de Conti and her children the Louis Armand, prince de Conti and Mademoiselle de La Roche-sur-Yon. Also present were the Maine couple with their children Louis Auguste, Prince of Dombes and Louis Charles de Bourbon, comte d'Eu. 

Two days after the marriage, Vendôme left his wife at Sceaux to retire to the château d'Anet. He left her the title and estates of the dukedom of Étampes. When she died, it went to her niece, Louise Élisabeth de Bourbon, princess of Conti. The marriage remained childless. Louis Joseph died in 1712. In 1714 Marie Anne began improvements and extensions to the Hôtel de Vendôme in Paris, where she died in 1718, aged 40. She was buried in the Carmelite Convent of the Faubourg Saint-Jacques, in Paris.

Ancestry

References and notes

|-

French suo jure nobility
1678 births
1718 deaths
Counts of Dreux
Duchesses of Étampes
Duchesses of Vendôme
Countesses of Dreux
House of Bourbon
17th-century French people
18th-century French people
Burials at the Carmel du faubourg Saint-Jacques